Radio Sarajevo 90,2 is a Bosnian commercial radio station, broadcasting from Sarajevo, Bosnia and Herzegovina.

The program is currently broadcast at one frequency (Sarajevo ), estimated number of potential listeners is around 443,685. It focuses on Urban music and entertainment talk shows.

Former Radio Zid - Sarajevo (89.9 FM MHz) changed its name to current Radio Sarajevo 90,2 on 1 April 2004. The new name of the portal and the radio station reminds on the history of the former national public radio station in Bosnia and Herzegovina, 1945–1992, called Radio Sarajevo. Today, its legal successor is national public broadcasting service, BHRT via BH Radio 1.

Frequencies

 Sarajevo

See also 
 Radio Sarajevo

References

External links 
 
 Communications Regulatory Agency of Bosnia and Herzegovina
 RadioSarajevo in Facebook

See also 
List of radio stations in Bosnia and Herzegovina

Sarajevo
Mass media in Sarajevo
Radio stations established in 2004